Giovanni Marra (5 February 1931 – 11 July 2018) was an Italian Roman Catholic prelate.

Ordained to the priesthood in 1953, Marra was appointed bishop of Usula in 1986. He subsequently led the Military Ordinariate of Italy from 1989 until his resignation in 1996. The next year Marra was named archbishop of Messina–Lipari–Santa Lucia del Mela, serving until retirement in 2006. He died on 11 July 2018, aged 87.

Notes

1931 births
2018 deaths
Italian Roman Catholic archbishops
People from the Province of Reggio Calabria